Machang is a town of Qing County in eastern Hebei province, China, located  south of the border with Tianjin and  northeast of the county seat. , it has 24 villages under its administration.

See also
List of township-level divisions of Hebei

References

Township-level divisions of Hebei